Hubert Egger (4 June 1927 in Bernau am Chiemsee - 3 December 2014 in Prien am Chiemsee) was a West German cross-country skier who competed in the 1950s. He competed in the 18 km event at the 1952 Winter Olympics in Oslo, but did not finish.

External links
18 km Olympic cross country results: 1948-52
Hubert Egger's profile at Sports Reference.com

Olympic cross-country skiers of Germany
Cross-country skiers at the 1952 Winter Olympics
German male cross-country skiers
1927 births
2014 deaths
People from Rosenheim (district)
Sportspeople from Upper Bavaria